Zdenci is a village and municipality in Croatia in the Virovitica–Podravina County. It has a population of 2,225 (2001 census), 88% of whom are Croats.

Notable natives and residents

Jovo Stanisavljević Čaruga

External links
  

Municipalities of Croatia
Populated places in Virovitica-Podravina County
Slavonia